Alikhanmakhi (Dargwa: Гӏялиханмахьи) is a rural locality (a selo) and the administrative centre of Alikhanmakhinsky Selsoviet, Akushinsky District, Republic of Dagestan, Russia. The population was 826 as of 2010. There are 8 streets.

Geography 
Alikhanmakhi is located on the Akusha River, 22 km northwest of Akusha (the district's administrative centre) by road. Guladtymakhi is the nearest rural locality.

References 

Rural localities in Akushinsky District